HMB may refer to:

Compounds
 β-Hydroxy β-methylbutyric acid, a metabolite of the essential amino acid leucine, synthesized in the human body
Human Melanoma Black, a monoclonal antibody

Languages
 Humburi Senni language, spoken in Burkina Faso and Mali

Places
 Half Moon Bay, California, city in the United States

Sports
 Historical medieval battles, a modern sport

Other
 Hawkeye Marching Band, the marching band for the University of Iowa
 HabibMetro, a Swiss multinational bank in Pakistan
 Heavy menstrual bleeding, a menstrual condition
 Host Memory Buffer, an optional feature in version 1.2 of the NVMe specification, which allows SSDs to utilize the DRAM of the host machine
 His/Her Magesty's Barque